This article covers the 2014 football season in Chile.

National tournaments

Primera División

Clausura Champion: Colo-Colo
Topscorer: Esteban Paredes
Apetura Champion: Club Universidad de Chile
Topscorer: Esteban Paredes

Copa Chile

Champion: Deportes Iquique
Topscorer: Rodrigo Díaz

National team results

The Chile national football team results and fixtures for 2014.

2014 FIFA World Cup

Friendly matches

Record

Goal scorers

External links
The official Chilean Football Association web site

 
Seasons in Chilean football